The Rio Negro brush-tailed rat or dark brush-tailed tree rat (Isothrix negrensis), is a spiny rat species found in Brazil.

References

Isothrix
Mammals described in 1920
Taxa named by Oldfield Thomas